Kill or Be Killed (filmed as Red on Yella, Kill a Fella) is a 2015 American Western film written and directed by Duane Graves and Justin Meeks.  Meeks stars as a notorious Texas criminal whose gang is slowly picked off one-by-one by an unknown killer.  It premiered at the ninth Dallas International Film Festival and was released in the US on March 1, 2016.

Plot 
In 1900 Texas, Claude "Sweet Tooth" Barbee, Frank "Blockey" Jackson, and Tom Nixon ambush a chain gang to free their fellow gang member, "Slap" Jack Davis.  Davis knows where the gold from their last robbery is, but the others are dismayed when it turns out to be 500 miles away.  Nixon, their leader, balks at the journey, but the others threaten to go without him.  On the way, they meet a traveling salesman and his ward, a teenager who operates a ventriloquist's dummy.  Amused by the puppet, the men pause to listen to their pitch, only to become enraged when the salesman beats the boy.  After killing the salesman, Barbee accepts the boy, Willie, into their gang.  They are joined shortly by Goody Spotswood, their scout.  As they pass through a town, the gang kills several people while robbing a local church, and Davis is wounded.

Meanwhile, Rudy Goebel murders his employer.  When his wife protests, he kills her, too.  As he dumps his wife's body in the cellar, he calls down to his children, chastising them for an unspecified transgression.  After Goebel locks his children in with their mother's corpse, the Nixon gang barges into the house, seeking aid.  All but Barbee eat Goebel's drugged soup.  As Goebel tortures Davis, Barbee wakes and kills Goebel.  The gang leaves the house in the morning.  The next time they camp, they wake to find Nixon dead.  After they accuse each other of his murder, Barbee settles the matter by saying Nixon was old and probably died of natural causes.

Barbee becomes the de faco leader, and his gang robs several towns on their way to the gold.  Sheriff Everheart and Deputy Peak chase after him, encouraged by the reward and the thought of being hailed as heroes.  The Barbee gang takes refuge at the Wilberforce homestead, where Jackson rapes and murders the Wilberforces' daughter.  Barbee reluctantly kills her vengeful father but stops the gang from killing the other family members.  Although spooked that one of their horses has been brutally slaughtered, they steal a horse from the Wilberforce barn and flee.

After they rob a whorehouse, ex-prostitute Pearl follows after them, asking to join.  As she and Barbee become closer, he tells her about the gold.  She and Barbee have sex at a hotel where Everheart and Peak are staying, and Barbee leaves a taunting note for them.  When Barbee wakes, Pearl and the map to the gold are gone, and Willie is dead.  The others blame Pearl for Willie's murder, but Barbee reasons Pearl is no murderer; instead, he suggests a crazed native American is responsible.  Spotswood dies next, and Barbee is haunted by nightmares of a bestial man who hunts his gang.

While Davis seeks aid from a doctor, Pearl tips off Everheart.  Barbee, Davis, and Jackson come upon a man who is attacking a woman.  Satisfied this is Spotswood's murderer, they kill him.  When they set up camp, Jackson wanders off.  As Barbee and Davis find Jackson's mutilated body, Everheart and Peak catch up to them.  Peak is killed in the resulting shootout, and Davis is further wounded.  Everheart chases Barbee and Davis to a barn, intending to smoke them out, but Barbee kills Everheart.  Convinced his wounds are fatal, Davis reveals that the gold is at the bottom of a well.  That night, Barbee dreams of the bestial man, and wakes to find that Davis' throat has been slit.  At Davis' request, Barbee mercy-kills Davis as he slowly bleeds to death.

Barbee pretends to shoot himself in grief.  When the killer reveals himself, Barbee is surprised to find it is one of Goebel's sons.  After killing the boy, Barbee reaches the well.  There, he is wounded by a bounty hunter, whom he kills.  Barbee collects the gold, only to be attacked by Goebel's other son, a twin.  Surprised, Barbee asks how they could be so evil at such a young age.  The boy pushes the wounded Barbee into the deep well, where he finds Pearl's corpse at the bottom.  The boy walks off, ignoring Barbee's cries.

Cast 
 Justin Meeks as Claude "Sweet Tooth" Barbee
 Paul McCarthy-Boyington as "Slap" Jack Davis
 Greg Kelly as Frank "Blockey" Jackson
 Deon Lucas as Goody Spotswood
 Bridger Zadina as Willie Carson
 Larry Grant Harbin as Tom Nixon
 Arianne Margot as Pearl
 Luce Rains as Sheriff Everheart
 Timothy McKinney as Deputy Peak
 Edwin Neal as Bargsley
 Michael Berryman as Dr. Pepperdine
 Pepe Serna as Rudy Goebel
 Gayland Williams as Ivy Goebel

Production 
The story was loosely inspired by the exploits of real-life outlaw Sam Bass, who operated in Texas in the nineteenth century.  After Duane Graves and Justin Meeks premiered an earlier collaboration, The Wild Man of the Navidad, they pitched the concept of a gritty Western to The Weinstein Company.  They said that when TWC took it seriously, they focused their attention on making a tight script.  Although they lost their contacts at TWC, Kim Henkel, their former film instructor, recruited them to make Butcher Boys.  After that work-for-hire experience, they returned to their own project.  They said people praised their script but doubted their ability to realize it within their budgetary limitations.  To do this, Meeks and Graves used as many existing locations as possible.  When they had difficulty shooting in a real church, they scouted locations until they found an Old West replica church that looked realistic.  Filming took a total of six weeks.

Release 
Kill or Be Killed premiered at the ninth Dallas International Film Festival on April 10, 2015.  RLJ Entertainment released it in the United States on March 1, 2016.

Reception 
Richard Whittaker of The Austin Chronicle wrote that the film's uncompromising authenticity can be a detriment, as it makes the dialog difficult to understand at times.  Whittaker says the film has more of a noir feel than most Westerns, and the characters, who become more realized in the second act, are mostly shades of gray.  Chris Coffel of Bloody Disgusting rated it 3/5 stars and wrote that the film is worth watching despite its flaws, which include CGI blood and a somewhat confusing narrative.  Though he praised the acting of Meeks and McCarthy-Boyington, Coffel said the rest of the cast "leave a lot to be desired".  Mark L. Miller of Ain't It Cool News compared it to 1960s Spaghetti Westerns, saying that it also includes themes from horror films.  Miller called it "one of those fantastic genre mash-ups that work because it feels authentic and real".

References

Further reading 
 AICN Horror talks with Duane Graves and Justin Meeks about Western genre-bender Kill or Be Killed!
 Interview: Justin Meeks and Duane Graves Talk Horror Western Kill or Be Killed
 Q&A: Hit the Trail With the Creators of the Horror/Western Kill or Be Killed
 Interview: Justin Meeks, star/co-writer/co-director, Kill or Be Killed
 Justin Meeks & Duane Graves Interview  The Action Elite
 Icons of Fright Talks Westerns and More With Kill or Be Killed Directors Justin Meeks & Duane Graves

External links 
 
 

2015 films
2015 independent films
2010s crime thriller films
2015 Western (genre) films
American crime thriller films
American Western (genre) films
American independent films
2010s English-language films
American neo-noir films
Films set in Texas
Films shot in Texas
2010s American films